Francis John Hyde Wollaston  FRS (13 April 1762, London – 12 October 1823) was an English natural philosopher and Jacksonian Professor at the University of Cambridge.

Life
Francis John Hyde Wollaston was the son of Francis Wollaston (1731–1815) and Althea Hyde, and brother to William Hyde Wollaston (1766-1828). He was educated in Scarning, Norfolk and at Charterhouse before entering Sidney Sussex College, Cambridge in 1779. He graduated as senior wrangler in 1783, became a fellow of Trinity Hall in 1785, and was ordained a priest in 1787.

Wollaston was elected a Fellow of the Royal Society in 1786. From 1792 to 1813 he was Jacksonian Professor at Cambridge. Resigning his Trinity Hall fellowship to marry Frances Hayles in 1793, he became Rector of South Weald the following year. In 1807 he was elected Master of Sidney Sussex College, but the election was declared invalid on the grounds that he had never been a fellow of Sidney Sussex. On resigning his professorship in 1813, he assumed additional clerical duties: from 1813 to 1823 he was rector of Cold Norton and Archdeacon of Essex.

He is buried with his father in St Nicholas's Churchyard in Chislehurst.

Works
A Plan of a Course of Chemical Lectures, 1794
Charge, delivered to the Clergy of the Archdeaconry of Essex, 1815

References

External links

Archdeacons of Essex
Jacksonian Professors of Natural Philosophy
Fellows of the Royal Society
1762 births
1823 deaths
Senior Wranglers
People educated at Charterhouse School
Fellows of Trinity Hall, Cambridge
Masters of Sidney Sussex College, Cambridge
Natural philosophers